Shahnaz or Shahnez or Shehnaz is a  given name and surname of Persian origin. The name is made from شاه (Shah, "king"), and ناز (Naz, "pride"), so the name means "pride of the king".

Notable bearers 
Shahnaz Bashir, Indian novelist
Shahnez Boushaki, Algerian basketball player
Shahnaz Bukhari, Pakistani clinical psychologist, and activist
Shehnaz Gill (born 1993), Indian actress
Shahnaz Husain (born 1944), Indian entrepreneur
Shahnaz Pahlavi (born 1940), Iranian princess
Shahnaz Pakravan, British radio and television presenter
Shenaz Patel (born 1966), Indo-Mauritian writer
Shahnaz Rahmatullah, Bangladeshi singer
Shahnaz Sheikh, Pakistani field hockey player
Shehnaz Sheikh, Pakistani actress
Shenaz Treasury, Indian actress
Shahnaz Wazir Ali, Special Assistant to the Prime Minister of Pakistan
Jalil Shahnaz (born 1921), Iranian tar player born in 1921 in Isfahan

Places
Shahnaz street, a street in Tabriz, Iran

Persian given names
Hindu given names
Surnames of Indo-Iranian origin
Persian unisex given names
Arabic unisex given names